Boghi Kalon is a village in the Republic of Tajikistan. It is part of the city of Istaravshan in Sughd Region.

References

Populated places in Sughd Region